The Tanah Merah Bridge is the main bridge on Kelantan River near Tanah Merah, Kelantan, Malaysia. It is located at Federal Route 4. The 600m bridge was opened on 1 February 1988 and it is located near Guillemard Bridge.

The Guillemard Bridge was used by all vehicles until 1 February 1988 when a new bridge was completed along Federal Route 4, a few kilometres away.

See also
 Transport in Malaysia

Bridges in Kelantan
1988 establishments in Malaysia